Alexander Trojan (30 March 1914 – 19 September 1992) was an Austrian film actor. He appeared in more than 20 films between 1939 and 1977. He starred in the film Panoptikum 59, which was entered into the 9th Berlin International Film Festival.

Selected filmography
 Woman in the River (1939)
 The Eternal Spring (1940)
 Gabriele Dambrone (1943)
 No Sin on the Alpine Pastures (1950)
 Espionage (1955)
 Panoptikum 59 (1959)
 Das Riesenrad (1961)

References

External links

1914 births
1992 deaths
Austrian male film actors
Male actors from Vienna
20th-century Austrian male actors